Eupithecia eduardi is a moth in the family Geometridae. It was described by Vladimir G. Mironov and Ulrich Ratzel in 2012 and it is found in Iran.

References

Moths described in 2012
eduardi
Moths of the Middle East